Over the past century, there have been numerous films set in Rome, and the city has a particularly strong cinematic tradition. The city hosts the Cinecittà Studios, the largest film and television production facility in continental Europe and the centre of the Italian cinema, where a large number of today's biggest box office hits are filmed. The 99-acre (40-ha) studio complex is 5.6 miles (9 km) from the centre of Rome and is part of one of the biggest production communities in the world, second only to Hollywood.

List of films

 20 Million Miles to Earth (1957)
 Angels & Demons (2009)
 The Belly of an Architect (1987)
 The Bicycle Thief (1948)
 A Cat in the Brain (1990)
 Coins in the Fountain (1990)
 The Core (2003)
 La Dolce Vita (1960)
 Double Team (1997)
 Eat Pray Love (2010)
 L'eclisse (1962)
 EuroTrip (2004)
 Gidget Goes to Rome (1963)
 The Girl Who Knew Too Much (1963)
 The Great Beauty (2013)
 Hudson Hawk (1991)
 John Wick: Chapter 2 (2017)
 John Wick: Chapter 3 – Parabellum (2019)
 Jumper (2008)
 Light in the Piazza (1962)
 Love Live! The School Idol Movie: Over the Rainbow 
 The Lizzie McGuire Movie (2003)
 Madagascar 3: Europe's Most Wanted (2012)
 Megiddo: The Omega Code 2 (2001)
 Mignon Has Come to Stay (1988)
 Mission: Impossible III (2006)
 Nine (2009)
 Ocean's Twelve (2004)
 Only You (1994)
 The Omega Code (1999)
 The Omen (2006)
 The Pink Panther 2 (2009)
 The Pope Must Die (1991)
 Roma (1972)
 Roman Holiday (1953)
 The Roman Spring of Mrs. Stone (1961)
 Rome 11:00 (1952)
 Rome Adventure (1962)
 Rome, Open City (1945)
 Rome Tram
 Sabrina Goes to Rome (1998)
 Scooby-Doo and the Cyber Chase (2001)
 Shooting the Moon (1998)
 Spectre (2015)
 The Talented Mr. Ripley (1999)
 Terminal Station (1953)
 Three Coins in the Fountain (1954)
 Three Strangers in Rome (1958)
 The Tiger and the Snow (2005)
 To Rome with Love (2012)
 Umberto D. (1952)
 Way of the Dragon (1972)
 Three Girls from Rome (1952)
 When in Rome (1952)
 When in Rome (2002)
 When in Rome (2010)
 Zoolander 2 (2016)
 The Roman Spring of Mrs. Stone (2003)

References

Rome
Films